In genetics, expressivity is the degree to which a phenotype is expressed by individuals having a particular genotype. (Alternately, it may refer to the expression of particular gene by individuals having a certain phenotype.) Expressivity is related to the intensity of a given phenotype; it differs from penetrance, which refers to the proportion of individuals with a particular genotype that actually express the phenotype.

Variable expressivity 
Variable expressivity refers to the degree in which a genotype is phenotypically expressed. For example, multiple people with the same disease can have the same genotype but one may express more severe symptoms, while another carrier may appear normal. This variation in expression can be affected by modifier genes, epigenetic factors or the environment. Modifier genes can alter the expression of other genes in either an additive or multiplicative way. Meaning the phenotype that is observed can be a result of two different alleles being summed or multiplied. However, a reduction in expression may also occur in which the primary locus, where the phenotype is expressed, is affected. Epigenetic factors, such as cis-regulatory elements, can also cause variability in expression by inducing variation in transcript abundance.

Examples 
Three common syndromes that involved phenotypic variability due to expressivity include: Marfan syndrome, Van der Woude Syndrome, and neurofibromatosis. 

The characteristics of Marfan syndrome widely vary among individuals. The syndrome affects connective tissue in the body and has a spectrum of symptoms ranging from mild bone and joint involvement to severe neonatal forms and cardiovascular disease. This diversity in symptoms is a result of variable expressivity of the FBN1 gene found on chromosome 15 (see figure 1). The gene product is involved in the proper assembly of microfibrils.

Van der Woude syndrome is a condition that affects the development of the face, specifically a cleft lip (see figure 2), cleft palate or both . Carriers of the mutation can also have pits near the centre of the lower lip which may appear to be wet due to the presence of salivary glands. The resulting phenotypes expressed varies significantly among individuals. This variation can range so broadly that a study published by the Department of Orthodontics at the University of Athens showed that some individuals were unaware that they possessed the genotype for this condition until they were tested.

Neurofibromatosis (NF1), also known as Von Recklinghausen disease, is a genetic disorder that is caused by a mutation in the neurofibromin gene NF1 on chromosome 17. A loss of function mutation in the tumor suppressor gene can cause tumors on the nerves called neurofibromas. These appear as small bumps under the skin. It is stipulated that the phenotypic variation is a result of unlinked genetic modifiers.

See also 
Anticipation
Pleiotropy
Mendelian inheritance
Genetic heterogeneity
Haploinsufficiency

References

Further reading 

 

Population genetics